Series 17 or Season 17 may refer to:

 Lego Minifigures (theme)#Series 17, the toy line by Lego
 Roland TD-17 Series, a Drum Sound Module by Roland Corporation
 17" series laptops
 Alienware 17
 Dell Inspiron 17
 LG Gram 17

See also
 System 17